Monsignor is a 1982 American drama film directed by Frank Perry about a Roman Catholic priest's rise through the ranks of the Vatican, during and after World War II.  Along the way, he involves the Vatican in the black marketeering operations of a Mafia don, and has an affair with a woman in the postulant stage of becoming a nun. He eventually repents and returns to his faith, attempting to make right the things he has done wrong. The cast includes Christopher Reeve, Geneviève Bujold, Fernando Rey, Jason Miller, Joseph Cortese, Adolfo Celi, and Leonardo Cimino.

The film was not well received by critics and performed poorly at the box office; Reeve later blamed this on poor editing. Supporting actors Miller and Rey were singled out for their strong performances. The film was nominated for a Golden Raspberry Award for Worst Musical Score, the only Razzie nomination John Williams ever received in his career to date.

The filming location was entirely in Rome, Italy.

Plot

With the Vatican having financial difficulties during World War II, a young priest from America is sent for, recommended because of his accounting skill. He has already broken the rules, for his first assignment after ordination, is a military chaplain.  There he ministers to a dying soldier and then takes the dead soldier's position as a machine gunner and destroys a squadron of advancing German troops.  This action of a priest killing in combat gets him removed from that position, and he is then sent to the Vatican, with his knowledge of business and accounting.

Father John Flaherty does indeed have a good head for figures, but also believes in any means to an end. To raise money for the church, he is willing to enter into a black market operation with the Mafia, selling cartons of cigarettes by the tens of thousands for a percentage of the take.

The priest's morals are strained further when he develops a romantic interest in Clara, a young nun who is having a crisis of faith. They begin an affair, but Flaherty does not confess to her his true identity. One day during a papal ceremony, Clara catches sight of Flaherty in his clerical robes. Her love and trust are shattered.

Flaherty's methods may be overlooked, but his success at raising funds is appreciated by some of his superiors as he rises to become a monsignor, then a cardinal. When an ill-advised stock investment costs the Vatican millions, however, Flaherty must pay the price for his deeds.

Cast
 Christopher Reeve as Father Flaherty
 Geneviève Bujold as Clara
 Leonardo Cimino as The Pope
 Fernando Rey as Cardinal Santoni
 Adolfo Celi as Cardinal Vinci
 Jason Miller as Don Appolini
 Tomas Milian as Father Francisco 
 Robert Prosky as Bishop Walkman
 Joe Pantoliano as Private Musso
 Joseph Cortese as Ludovico 'Lodo' Varese
 Milena Vukotic as Sister Verna 
 Joe Spinell as Bride's Father
 Ettore Mattia as Pietro
 Gregory Snegoff as Soldier 
 Pamela Prati as Roman Girl
 Darin Berry as Altar Boy

Music
The score of the film is composed and conducted by John Williams and performed by the London Symphony Orchestra. The soundtrack was released in 1982.

In 2007, Intrada released a limited edition of Williams' score of the film and an expanded version was released on June 4, 2019.

Reception
On Rotten Tomatoes, the film has an approval rating of 0% based on 7 reviews, with an average rating of 2.4/10.

In 1983, Christopher Reeve said Monsignor "was a horrible picture and deserved to be lambasted" and a "very bad movie." He complained that the film "makes serious allegations about a religious figure and fails to prove it." Reeve lamented that "we had the material and it was misused," blaming the result on "corporate decision-making."

Controversy
On November 29, 1982, the film was banned from showing in the Republic of Ireland; the Irish Film Censor Board cited its conflation of religion and adultery, as it features an affair between a priest and a postulant nun. The decision was overturned by the Film Appeals Board on December 17; this caused controversy among members of Fianna Fáil – chairman Ned Brennan believed the majority of the Irish public did not want it to be released and said "standards must be maintained", wanting it banned on "moral grounds".

Notes

External links

1982 films
1982 crime drama films
1980s war drama films
20th Century Fox films
American crime drama films
American war drama films
1980s English-language films
Films critical of the Catholic Church
Films set in Vatican City
Films set in the 1940s
Films directed by Frank Perry
Films about capital punishment
Films with screenplays by Wendell Mayes
1980s American films